Saint Joachim, Saint-Joachim or St. Joachim may refer to:

 Joachim, in Christianity, the father of Mary, the mother of Jesus
 Joachim of Ithaca (1786–1868), Greek saint of the Eastern Orthodox Church
 Saint-Joachim, a commune in France
 Saint-Joachim, Quebec, a parish municipality in Quebec, Canada
 St. Joachim, a community in the town of Lakeshore, Ontario, Canada
 Saint Joachim (Wautier), a painting by the Flemish artist Michaelina Wautier

See also
 Saint-Joachim-de-Shefford, Quebec, a municipality in Quebec, Canada